Novy Artaul (Yañı Artawıl) is a rural locality (a selo) and the administrative centre of Novoartaulsky Selsoviet, Yanaulsky District, Bashkortostan, Russia. The population was 881 as of 2010. There are 8 streets.

Geography 
Novy Artaul is located 17 km northwest of Yanaul (the district's administrative centre) by road. Varyash is the nearest rural locality.

References 

Rural localities in Yanaulsky District